Jean-Baptiste Dortignacq (25 April 1884 Arudy, Pyrénées-Atlantiques – 13 May 1928 Peyrehorade, Landes) was a French road bicycle racer between 1900 and 1910.  Dortignacq won seven stages in four Tour de France events. He only competed in stage 4 of the first Tour de France in 1903, finishing 11th on the stage.

Major results

1903
 Tour de France
 11th, Stage 4 (Toulouse - Bordeaux)
1904
Tour de France
 2nd overall, + 2h16'14"
 1st, Stage 5 (Bordeaux - Nantes) 425 km
 1st, Stage 6 (Nantes - Paris) 471 km
1905
Tour de France
 3rd overall, + 2h16'14"
 1st, Stage 6 (Nîmes - Toulouse) 307 km
 1st, Stage 10 (Rennes - Caen) 167 km
 1st, Stage 11 (Caen - Paris) 253 km
1906
Tour de France
 Did Not Finish, abandon 10th stage
 1st, Stage 8 (Toulouse - Bayonne) 300 km
1908
Tour de France
 Did Not Finish, abandon 8th stage
 1st, Stage 5 (Grenoble - Nice) 345 km
1909
 Bordeaux-Toulouse
1910
 Giro di Romagna
 Giro d'Italia
Did Not Finish
1st, Stage 2 (Udine - Bologna) 322 km (first victory of a non-Italian racer in the Giro)

External links 

1884 births
1928 deaths
Sportspeople from Pyrénées-Atlantiques
French male cyclists
French Tour de France stage winners
French Giro d'Italia stage winners
Cyclists from Nouvelle-Aquitaine